Roman Jeffrey Wilson (born June 19, 2001) is an American football wide receiver for the Michigan Wolverines. He has played for Michigan since 2020.

Early years and high school career
Wilson was born in 2001 in Kihei, Hawaii. He grew up in Hawaii and attended Saint Louis School in Honolulu. During his time at Saint Louis, Wilson helped the team to a 38-game winning streak. As a senior in 2019, he caught 61 passes for 1,025 yards. In the 2019 state championship game, he caught eight passes for 171 yards.

College career
Wilson was rated as a four-star recruit. In July 2019, he committed to play college football for the University of Michigan.

As a freshman in the COVID-shortened 2020 season, Wilson appeared in all six games and caught nine passes for 122 yards. As a sophomore in 2021, he appeared in all 13 games and caught 25 passes for 420 yards and two touchdowns. He also rushed for 59 yards in 2021 on three carries.

In the 2022 season opener against Colorado State, Wilson caught a bubble screen pass and ran for a 61-yard touchdown. In week two, the Honolulu native faced his hometown team, Hawaii. In the first quarter, he scored two touchdowns on a 42-yard touchdown pass from J. J. McCarthy and a 21-yard run.  During the 2022 regular season, he caught 20 passes for 272 yards and three touchdowns.

College statistics

References

External links
 Michigan Wolverines bio

2001 births
Living people
American football wide receivers
Michigan Wolverines football players
Saint Louis School alumni
Sportspeople from Kalamazoo, Michigan
Players of American football from Honolulu